The Tango Cavalier is a 1923 American silent Western film directed by Charles R. Seeling and starring George Larkin, Frank Whitson and Ollie Kirkby.

Plot 
U.S. Secret Service agent Don Lawson goes on an undercover assignment as Don Armingo in a Mexican smuggling ring. Before he can make arrests, his love interest Doris is kidnapped, and Don is captured. Carmelita, a tango dancer enamored of Don, releases and tries to seduce him, but he rebuffs her. Don rescues Doris by picking her out of an automobile in an airplane as it crashes off an embankment.

Cast
 George Larkin as Don Armingo
 Frank Whitson as Colonel Pomeroy
 Dorris Dare as Doris
 Ollie Kirkby as Carmelita
 William Quinn as Brute Morgan
 Mike Tellegen as Strongarm

References

Bibliography
 Robert B. Connelly. The Silents: Silent Feature Films, 1910-36, Volume 40, Issue 2. December Press, 1998.

External links
 

1923 films
1923 Western (genre) films
American black-and-white films
Films directed by Charles R. Seeling
Silent American Western (genre) films
Films about the United States Secret Service
1920s English-language films
1920s American films